Gore Vidal's Billy the Kid, also known as Billy the Kid, is a 1989 American western television film about famed gunman Billy the Kid. It aired on TNT cable channel on May 10, 1989.

One of many depicting the events surrounding the outlaw during his participation in the Lincoln County War, this film, though little known, has routinely been described as the most historically accurate version to date. Written by Gore Vidal and directed by William A. Graham, with Val Kilmer starring in the lead role of William Bonney a.k.a. Billy the Kid, and with a supporting cast including Wilford Brimley, John O'Hurley, Duncan Regehr, and Ned Vaughn.

Cast
 Val Kilmer as  Billy the Kid (William Bonney)
 Duncan Regehr as Pat Garrett
 Wilford Brimley as Gov. Lew Wallace
 Julie Carmen as Celsa
 Albert Salmi as Mr. Maxwell
 Ned Vaughn as Charlie
 Ric San Nicholas as Bell
 Gore Vidal as Preacher (uncredited)
 René Auberjonois as Tunstall's cousin (uncredited)
 John O'Hurley as Dolan
 Michael Parks as Rynerson 
 Burr Steers as Billy Henchman
 Ned Vaughn as Charlie
 Tiny Wells as Cowman
 Red West as Joe Grant

Production
Vidal said in his memoirs that he had written the original teleplay for The Left Handed Gun, starring Paul Newman as Billy the Kid, decades earlier, and always felt the studio had butchered the material when his television play was used as the basis for a theatrical movie, so he wanted to return to the story for a more accurate rendition. At the time of his original teleplay with Newman, it was thought that the real Billy was left handed. This was based on a photo of Billy that had been inadvertently flipped when printed. Years later, the error was discovered—Billy was right handed.

Reception
While receiving little general attention, the television movie was acclaimed by fans of the western genre due to its comparative historical fidelity. Kilmer was praised for his portrayal based on his extensive work to not only physically resemble William Bonney as much as possible, but also to capture his personality as related in historical accounts. This contributed to the film being widely recognised as one of the most historically accurate "Billy the Kid" films ever made.

References

External links

Gore Vidal's Billy the Kid, Review
Film Bug, Val Kilmer
Kilmer's Reputation for "Plunging into a character"
Billy the Kid (1989) Trailer

1989 films
1989 Western (genre) films
Biographical films about Billy the Kid
Cultural depictions of Pat Garrett
Films with screenplays by Gore Vidal
Films directed by William Graham (director)
Films scored by Laurence Rosenthal
1989 television films
1980s American films